Hell on Wheels was the itinerant collection of flimsily assembled gambling houses, dance halls, saloons, and brothels that followed the army of Union Pacific Railroad workers westward as they constructed the first transcontinental railroad in 1860s North America. The huge numbers of wage-earning young men working in what was a remote wilderness, far from the constraints of home, provided a lucrative opportunity for business. As the end of the line continually moved westward, Hell on Wheels followed along, reconstructing itself on the outskirts of each town that became, in turn, the center of activity for the Union Pacific's construction work.

Etymology
In 1869, the use of the term "Hell on Wheels" to describe the phenomenon was documented by Springfield, Massachusetts Republican newspaper editor Samuel Bowles.

In popular culture
John Ford's silent film The Iron Horse (1924) portrayed an idealized image of Hell on Wheels.

AMC's television drama series, Hell On Wheels was originally broadcast from 2011 to 2016 and was set from 1865 to 1869. It centers on the mobile encampment that accompanied the construction of First Transcontinental Railroad, including the Union Pacific company men, surveyors, support workers, laborers, prostitutes, church staff, and mercenaries.

Several scenes in the 2013 Disney film The Lone Ranger briefly take place at a Hell on Wheels brothel.

Other uses
The 2nd Armored Division of the United States Army adopted the nickname "Hell on Wheels" during World War II.

References

External links
 
 Building the Transcontinental Railroad
 Map of Union Pacific Railroad with Dates
 Photo of Helltown at Benton, WY in 1868 (now a ghost town)

Union Pacific Railroad
English phrases